Madupalli is a village in the Ainavilli Mandal and East godavari  district in  Andhrapradesh 

Villages in Khammam district